Orangey, also known as Orangey Minerva (c. 1950–1967), was a male marmalade tabby cat, who was an animal actor owned and trained by the cinematic animal handler Frank Inn.

Career
Orangey (credited under various names) had a prolific career in film and television in the 1950s and early 1960s and was the only cat to win two PATSY Awards (Picture Animal Top Star of the Year, an animal actor's version of an Oscar), the first for the title role in Rhubarb (1951), a story about a cat who inherits a fortune, and the second for his portrayal of "Cat" in Breakfast at Tiffany's (1961). For this film Orangey won the 1962 PATSY Award for his portrayal of "the poor slob without a name." He has also been credited as the cat Mouschi in the film adaptation of The Diary of Anne Frank (1959). In that film, he nearly reveals the Jews' hiding place, and later becomes its only escapee. The cat was credited as the family pet, "Butch," in the film The Incredible Shrinking Man (1957), in which he is mistakenly assumed to have eaten the title character.

According to Sam Wasson, author of 5th Avenue, 5AM: Audrey Hepburn, Breakfast at Tiffany's, and the Dawn of the Modern Woman, Inn said Orangey was "a real New York type cat, just what we want. In no time at all I'm going to make a method, or Lee Strasberg type, cat out of him."

Orangey was called "the world's meanest cat" by one studio executive. He often scratched and bit actors. But he was prized for his ability to stay for several hours. Sometimes, however, he would flee after filming some scenes and production would be shut down until he could be found. Inn would sometimes have to post guard dogs at the studio entrance to keep him from running away.

Other appearances included a regular role as "Minerva" on the television series Our Miss Brooks (1952–1958).

The cat was also credited as "Jimmy," "Jeremy," and "Rhubarb." Orangey's last known appearance came in two consecutive episodes in the TV series Batman in 1967-68 in which he played an uncredited role alongside Eartha Kitt who portrayed Catwoman.

Sofia Bohdanowicz's 2020 short documentary film The Hardest Working Cat in Show Biz, based on Dan Sallitt’s essay of the same name, explores Orangey's history, mythology, and rumors that the name "Orangey" was ascribed to several different cats as opposed to one single cat.

Death
Orangey was buried at Forest Lawn Memorial Park (Hollywood Hills), located in Hollywood Hills, Los Angeles, California, United States.

Filmography 

Television
Our Miss Brooks (1952–1958) as Minerva (uncredited)
Alfred Hitchcock Presents (December 22, 1957) as Stanley the cat (uncredited)
Shirley Temple's Storybook (1958) as  The Cat 
The Dick Van Dyke Show (1962) as  Mr. Henderson 
The Beverly Hillbillies (1963) as Rusty, Cat 
My Favorite Martian (1963–1964) as  Herbie, Max the Cat, Cat on Footpath
Mission Impossible ("The Seal", 1967) as IMF agent Rusty the cat(uncredited)
Batman (1967–1968) as Cat

Documentary
Audrey Hepburn Remembered (1993) as Cat

Awards

See also
 List of individual cats

References

External links

Animal actors
Individual cats in the United States